On Guard is a 1927 American drama film serial directed by Arch Heath. It is considered to be lost.

Cast
 Cullen Landis as Bob Adams
 Muriel Kingston as Betty Lee
 Louise Du Pre as Catherine Nevens
 Walter P. Lewis as James Stagg
 Tom Blake as Sergeant Major Murphy
 Charles Martin as Colonel King
 Edward Burns as Jackson
 Jack Bardette
 Gus De Weil
 Tom Poland
 Harry Semels
 George F. Kelley
 Hal Forde

See also
 List of film serials
 List of film serials by studio

References

External links

1927 films
American silent serial films
1927 drama films
American black-and-white films
Pathé Exchange film serials
Lost American films
Silent American drama films
1927 lost films
Lost drama films
Films directed by Arch Heath
1920s American films